Lily of Laguna is a 1938 British drama film directed by Oswald Mitchell and starring Nora Swinburne, Richard Ainley and Talbot O'Farrell. It was made at Walton Studios. It takes its title from the music hall song "Lily of Laguna".

Main cast
 Nora Swinburne as Gloria Grey 
 Richard Ainley as Roger Fielding  
 Talbot O'Farrell as Mike  
 G. H. Mulcaster as Gerald Marshall  
 Jenny Laird as Jane Marshall  
 Edgar Driver as Tommy Thompson  
 Desmond Roberts as Arnold Egerton  
 Violet Graham as Margaret Marshall

References

Bibliography
 Low, Rachael. Filmmaking in 1930s Britain. George Allen & Unwin, 1985.
 Wood, Linda. British Films, 1927-1939. British Film Institute, 1986.

External links

1938 films
British drama films
1938 drama films
Films shot at Nettlefold Studios
Films directed by Oswald Mitchell
British black-and-white films
Films scored by Percival Mackey
1930s English-language films
1930s British films